2017 in television may refer to
 2017 in American television for television related events in the United States.
 List of 2017 American television debuts for television debut related events in the United States.
 2017 in Argentine television for television related events in Argentina.
 2017 in Australian television for television related events in Australia.
 2017 in British television for television related events in Great Britain.
 2017 in Scottish television for television related events in Scotland.
 2017 in Canadian television for television related events in Canada.
 2017 in Danish television for television related events in Denmark.
 2017 in Estonian television for television related events in Estonia.
 2017 in German television for television related events in Germany.
 2017 in Indian television for television related events in India.
 2017 in Irish television for television related events in Ireland.
 2017 in Italian television for television related events in Italy.
 2017 in Japanese television for television related events in Japan.
 2017 in Mexican television for television related events in Mexico.
 2017 in Pakistani television for television related events in Pakistan.
 2017 in Philippine television for television related events in the Philippines.
 2017 in Portuguese television for television related events in Portugal.
 2017 in South African television for television related events in South Africa.
 2017 in South Korean television for television related events in South Korea.

 
Mass media timelines by year